The 1914–15 Duquesne Dukes men's basketball team represents Duquesne University during the 1914–15 college men's basketball season. The head coach was Eugene McGuigan coaching the Dukes in his first year. The team finished the season with an overall record of 12–2.

Schedule

|-

References

Duquesne Dukes men's basketball seasons
Duquesne